Isabel Cristina Teodoro Fillardis (born August 3, 1973, in Rio de Janeiro, Brazil) is a Brazilian actress and model.

Career 

Fillardis began her career as a model at age 11, and at 15 she became a professional model. Two years later, at the insistence of her agency, Ford Models, she marked her acting debut in the role of "Ritinha" in Renascer, a soap opera aired by TV Globo. She participated as one of three members in the girl group Sublimes, which had ephemeral success in the 1990s. In November 1996, she posed nude for Playboy magazine.

Fillardis has starred in several telenovelas like A Lua Me Disse, Começar de Novo, A Padroeira, Força de um Desejo, Corpo Dourado, A Indomada, O Fim do Mundo, A Próxima Vítima, and Pátria Minha.

In films, Fillardis appeared in Orfeu, Navalha na Carne, and O Homem Nu.

In 2007, Fillardis joined the cast of the telenovela Sete Pecados, created by Walcyr Carrasco, and in 2008, she joined the cast of the television series Malhação.

In 2011, the actress made a cameo in the last chapter of the soap opera Insensato Coração, playing the lawyer Mônica Fina Estampa in the telenovela.

Personal life 

Fillardis is currently single, but she previously married engineer Júlio César Santos and is mother of Analuz. Fillardis was pregnant with her second son, Jamal Anuar, and two months after the birth of the child, discovered that he was a carrier of West syndrome, a type of epilepsy that alters the development of mind. Stirred, she decided to plead for the cause of disease carriers, and in 2006 launched the forces of good, dedicated to promoting assistance to persons who require special care (visual, mental, hearing, and/or motor disabilities) and who do not have the financial means to do so.

In 2003, she founded the NGO Donate Your Junk, focused on socio-environmental area. On December 28, 2013, the actress gave birth to her third son, Kalel.

Filmography

Television

Film

References

External links 

1973 births
Living people
Actresses from Rio de Janeiro (city)
Brazilian television actresses
Brazilian telenovela actresses
Brazilian film actresses
Brazilian stage actresses
Brazilian female models
Afro-Brazilian actresses
Afro-Brazilian female models